Cyril Hardcastle (22 November 1919 – 13 July 1982) was an English footballer who played as a centre forward.

Career
Born in Halifax, Hardcastle played for Pateley Bridge and Bradford City.

For Bradford City he made 4 appearances in the Football League.

Sources

References

1919 births
1982 deaths
English footballers
Bradford City A.F.C. players
English Football League players
Association football forwards